Ericeia subsignata is a moth of the  family Erebidae. It is known from Australia, including the Australian Capital Territory.

Adults are pale brown with dark brown spots and blotches.

References

Moths described in 1858
Ericeia